Leon Suzin (18 June 1901 – 21 December 1976) was a Polish architect. His work was part of the architecture event in the art competition at the 1928 Summer Olympics.

References

1901 births
1976 deaths
20th-century Polish architects
Olympic competitors in art competitions
Architects from Warsaw